Steam is a video game digital distribution service and storefront from Valve. It was launched as a software client in September 2003 as a way for Valve to provide automatic updates for their games, and expanded to distributing third-party game publishers' titles in late 2005. Steam offers various features, like digital rights management (DRM), game server matchmaking, anti-cheat measures, social networking and game streaming services. Users receive automatic game updates, cloud storage for game progress, and community features such as direct messaging, in-game chats and a community market.

Valve released a freely available application programming interface (API) called Steamworks in 2008, which developers can use to integrate Steam's functions into their products, including in-game achievements, microtransactions, and user-created content support. Initially developed for Microsoft Windows operating systems, Steam was released for macOS in 2010 and Linux in 2012. Mobile apps to access online Steam features were first released for iOS and Android in 2012. The platform also offers other digital content and Valve gaming hardware, including productivity software, game soundtracks, videos and VR headset Valve Index.

The service is the largest digital distribution platform for PC gaming, estimated around 75% of the market share in 2013 according to IHS Screen Digest. By 2017, users purchasing games through Steam totaled approximately 4.3 billion, representing at least 18% of global PC game sales according to Steam Spy. By 2021, the service had over 34,000 games with over 132 million monthly active users. The success of Steam has led to the development of the Steam Machine line of gaming PCs in 2015, which includes the SteamOS operating system and Steam Controller, Steam Link devices for local game streaming, and the handheld Steam Deck tailored for running Steam games in 2022.

History 

Valve had entered into a publishing contract with Sierra Studios in 1997 ahead of the 1998 release of Half-Life. The contract had given some intellectual property (IP) rights to Sierra in addition to publishing control. Valve published additional games through Sierra, including expansions for Half-Life and Counter-Strike. Around 1999, as Valve started work on Half-Life 2 and the new Source engine, they became concerned about their contract with Sierra related to the IP rights, and the two companies negotiated a new contract by 2001. The new contract eliminated Sierra's IP rights and gave Valve rights to digital distribution of its games.

Valve was looking for a way to better update its published games as providing downloadable patches for multiplayer games resulted in most of the online user base disconnecting for several days until players had installed the patch. Valve decided to create a platform that would update games automatically and implement stronger anti-piracy and anti-cheat measures. Through user polls at the time of its announcement in 2002, Valve also recognized that at least 75% of their users had access to high-speed Internet connections, which would continue to grow with planned broadband expansion in the following years, and recognized that they could deliver game content faster to players than through retail channels. Valve approached several companies, including Microsoft, Yahoo!, and RealNetworks to build a client with these features, but were declined.

Steam's development began in 2002, with working names for the platform being "Grid" and "Gazelle". It was publicly announced at the Game Developers Conference event on March 22, 2002, and released for beta testing the same day. To demonstrate the ease of integrating Steam with a game, Relic Entertainment created a special version of its game Impossible Creatures. Valve partnered with several companies, including AT&T, Acer, and GameSpy. The first mod released on the system was Day of Defeat.

Prior to the announcement of Steam, Valve found that Sierra had been distributing their games in PC cafes which they claimed was against the terms of the contract, and took Sierra and their owners, Vivendi Games, to court in 2002. Sierra countersued, asserting that with the announcement of Steam, Valve had been working to undermine the contract to offer a digital storefront for their games, directly competing with Sierra. The case was initially ruled in Valve's favor, allowing them to leave the contract due to the breach and seek other publishing partners for retail copies of its games while continuing their work on Steam. One such company had been Microsoft, but Ed Fries stated that they turned down the offer due to Valve's intent to continue to sell their games over Steam.

Between 80,000 and 300,000 players participated in the beta test before Steam's official release on September 12, 2003. A monthly subscription to Valve games on Steam was planned. The client and website suffered outages and bugs at launch. At the time, Steam's primary function was streamlining the patch process common in online computer games, and was an optional component for all other games. In 2004, the World Opponent Network was shut down and replaced by Steam, with any online features of games that required it ceasing to work unless they converted over to Steam.

In November 2004, Half-Life 2 was the first game to be offered digitally on Steam and require installation of the Steam client to play for retail copies. During this time users faced problems attempting to play the game. The requirement of Steam was met with concerns about software ownership, software requirements, and problems with overloaded servers demonstrated previously by the Counter-Strike rollout.

In 2005, third-party developers were contracted to release games on Steam, such as Rag Doll Kung Fu and Darwinia. Valve announced that Steam had become profitable because of some highly successful Valve games. Although digital distribution could not yet match retail volume, profit margins for Valve and developers were far larger on Steam. Publishers, such as id Software, Eidos Interactive, and Capcom, began distributing their games on Steam in 2007. By May of that year, 13 million accounts had been created on the service, and 150 games were for sale on the platform. In 2008, more publishers like Ubisoft, THQ, Sega, Take-Two Interactive, Activision, and Electronic Arts had partnered with the service, but some games were unavailable or overpriced relative to market outside North America.

In May 2007, ATI included Steam in the ATI Catalyst GPU driver as well as offering a free Steam copy of Half-Life 2: Lost Coast and Half-Life 2: Deathmatch to ATI Radeon owners. In January 2008, Nvidia promoted Steam in the GeForce GPU driver, as well as offering a free Steam copy of Portal: The First Slice to Nvidia hardware owners. Traditional retail versions of games required mandatory installation of Steam, Call of Duty: Modern Warfare 2 from Activision in 2009, Fallout: New Vegas from Bethesda Softworks in 2010 and Dragon Age II from Electronic Arts in 2011.

Electronic Arts removed some of its games from Steam because of restrictive terms of service related to downloadable content in 2011 and launched its games beginning with Mass Effect 3 on its Origin service and other stores in 2012. Newell stated "We have to show EA it's a smart decision to have EA games on Steam, and we’re going to try to show them that." Valve held conferences called Steam Dev Days from 2013 to 2014. In 2014, Ubisoft games started to require Uplay to run after launching the game from Steam. In 2019, Ubisoft announced that they would stop selling their future games on Steam starting with Tom Clancy's The Division 2 because Valve would not modify its revenue sharing model, with the company simultaneously announcing a deal with Epic Games to start selling their games on the recently launched Epic Games Store in addition to uPlay (which would later be rebranded to Ubisoft Connect). In May 2019, Microsoft distributed its games on Steam in addition to the Microsoft Store. In 2020, EA started to publish select games on Steam, and offering its rebranded subscription service EA Play on the platform. In 2022, Ubisoft announced that they would return to selling its recent games on Steam after leaving the storefront in 2019, starting with Assassin's Creed Valhalla, citing that they were "constantly evaluating how to bring our games to different audiences wherever they are".

By 2014, total annual game sales on Steam were estimated at around $1.5 billion. By 2018, the service had over 90 million monthly active users. In 2018, its network delivered 15 billion gigabytes of data, compared to less than 4 billion in 2014.

Features and functionality

Software delivery and maintenance 
Steam's primary service is to allow its users to purchase games and other software, adding them to a virtual library from which they may be downloaded and installed an unlimited number of times. Initially, Valve was required to be the publisher for these games since they had sole access to the Steam's database and engine, but with the introduction of the Steamworks software development kit (SDK) in May 2008, anyone could integrate Steam into their game without Valve's direct involvement.

Valve intended to "make DRM obsolete" as games released on Steam had traditional anti-piracy measures, including the assignment and distribution of product keys and support for digital rights management software tools such as SecuROM or non-malicious rootkits. With an update to the Steamworks SDK in March 2009, Valve added its "Custom Executable Generation" (CEG) approach into the Steamworks SDK. The CEG technology creates a unique, encrypted copy of the game's executable files for the given user, which allows them to install it multiple times and on multiple devices, and make backup copies of their software. Once the software is downloaded and installed, the user must then authenticate through Steam to de-encrypt the executable files to play the game. Normally this is done while connected to the Internet following the user's credential validation, but once they have logged into Steam once, a user can instruct Steam to launch in a special offline mode to be able to play their games without a network connection. Developers are not limited to Steam's CEG and may include other forms of DRM (or none at all) and other authentication services than Steam; for example, some games from publisher Ubisoft require the use of their UPlay gaming service. Other games required Games for Windows – Live, of which many transitioned to using the Steamworks CEG approach following its shutdown in 2014.

In November 2007, Steam achievements were added, similar to Xbox 360 Achievements. In September 2008, Valve added support for Steam Cloud, a service that can automatically store saved game and related custom files on Valve's servers; users can access this data from any machine running the Steam client. Games must use the appropriate features of Steamworks for Steam Cloud to work. Users can disable this feature on a per-game and per-account basis. Cloud saving was expanded in January 2022 for Dynamic Cloud Sync, allowing games developed with this feature to store saved states to Steam Cloud while a game is running rather than waiting until the user quit out of the game; this was added ahead of the portable Steam Deck unit so that users can save from the Deck and then put the unit into a suspended state. In May 2012, the service added the ability for users to manage their game libraries from remote clients, including computers and mobile devices; users can instruct Steam to download and install games they own through this service if their Steam client is currently active and running. Product keys sold through third-party retailers can also be redeemed on Steam. For games that incorporate Steamworks, users can buy redemption codes from other vendors and redeem these in the Steam client to add the title to their libraries. Steam also offers a framework for selling and distributing downloadable content (DLC) for games.

In September 2013, Steam introduced the ability to share most games with family members and close friends by authorizing machines to access one's library. Authorized players can install the game locally and play it separately from the owning account. Users can access their saved games and achievements providing the main owner is not playing. When the main player initiates a game while a shared account is using it, the shared account user is allowed a few minutes to either save their progress and close the game or purchase the game for his or her own account. Within Family View, introduced in January 2014, parents can adjust settings for their children's tied accounts, limiting the functionality and accessibility to the Steam client and purchased games.

In accordance with its acceptable use policy, Valve retains the right to block customers' access to their games and Steam services when Valve's Anti-Cheat (VAC) software determines that the user is cheating in multiplayer games, selling accounts to others, or trading games to exploit regional price differences. Blocking such users initially removed access to his or her other games, leading to some users with high-value accounts losing access because of minor infractions. Valve later changed its policy to be similar to that of Electronic Arts' Origin platform, in which blocked users can still access their games but are heavily restricted, limited to playing in offline mode and unable to participate in Steam Community features. Customers also lose access to their games and Steam account if they refuse to accept changes to Steam's end user license agreements; this last occurred in August 2012. In April 2015, Valve began allowing developers to set bans on players for their games, but enacted and enforced at the Steam level, which allowed them to police their own gaming communities in a customizable manner.

Storefront features 
The Steam client includes a digital storefront called the Steam Store through which users can purchase computer games. Once the game is bought, a software license is permanently attached to the user's Steam account, allowing them to download the software on any compatible device. Game licenses can be given to other accounts under certain conditions. Content is delivered from an international network of servers using a proprietary file transfer protocol. As of 2015, Steam sells its products in US and Canadian dollars, euros, pounds sterling, Brazilian reais, Russian rubles, Indonesian rupiah and Indian rupees depending on the user's location. In December 2010, the client began supporting the WebMoney payment system, which is popular in many European, Middle Eastern, and Asian countries. From April 2016 until December 2017, Steam accepted payments in Bitcoin with transactions handled by BitPay before dropping support for it due to high fluctuation in value and costly service fees. The Steam storefront validates the user's region; the purchase of games may be restricted to specific regions because of release dates, game classification, or agreements with publishers. Since 2010, the Steam Translation Server project offers Steam users to assist with the translation of the Steam client, storefront, and a selected library of Steam games for twenty-eight languages. In October 2018, official support for Vietnamese and Latin American Spanish was added, in addition to Steam's then 26 languages. Steam also allows users to purchase downloadable content for games, and for some specific games such as Team Fortress 2, the ability to purchase in-game inventory items. In February 2015, Steam began to open similar options for in-game item purchases for third-party games.

In conjunction with developers and publishers, Valve frequently provides discounted sales on games on a daily and weekly basis, sometimes oriented around a publisher, genre, or holiday theme, and sometimes allow games to be tried for free during the days of these sales. The site normally offers a large selection of games at discount during its annual Summer and Holiday sales, including gamification of these sales to incentive users to purchase more games.

Users of Steam's storefront can also purchase games and other software as gifts to be given to another Steam user. Prior to May 2017, users could purchase these gifts to be held in their profile's inventory until they opted to gift them. However, this feature enabled a gray market around some games, where a user in a country where the price of a game was substantially lower than elsewhere could stockpile giftable copies of games to sell to others, particularly in regions with much higher prices. In August 2016, Valve changed its gifting policy to require that games with VAC and Game Ban-enabled games be gifted immediately to another Steam user, which also served to combat players that worked around VAC and Game Bans, while in May 2017, Valve expanded this policy to all games. The changes also placed limitations on gifts between users of different countries if there is a large difference in pricing for the game between two different regions.

The Steam store also enables users to redeem store product keys to add software from their library. The keys are sold by third-party providers such as Humble Bundle (in which a portion of the sale is given back to the publisher or distributor), distributed as part of a physical release to redeem the game, or given to a user as part of promotions, often used to deliver Kickstarter and other crowd funding rewards. A grey market exists around Steam keys, where less reputable buyers purchase a large number of Steam keys for a game when it is offered for a low cost, and then resell these keys to users or other third-party sites at a higher price, generating profit for themselves. This caused some of these third-party sites, such as G2A, to be embroiled in this grey market. It is possible for publishers to have Valve to track down where specific keys have been used and cancel them, removing the product from the user's libraries, leaving the user to seek any recourse with the third-party they purchased from. Other legitimate storefronts, like Humble Bundle, have set a minimum price that must be spent to obtain Steam keys as to discourage mass purchases that would enter the grey market. In June 2021, Valve began limiting how frequently Steam users could change their default region to prevent them from purchasing games from outside their home region for cheaper.

In 2013, Steam began to accept player reviews of games. Other users can subsequently rate these reviews as helpful, humorous, or otherwise unhelpful, which are then used to highlight the most useful reviews on the game's Steam store page. Steam also aggregates these reviews and enables users to sort products based on this feedback while browsing the store. In May 2016, Steam further broke out these aggregations between all reviews overall and those made more recently in the last 30 days, a change Valve acknowledges to how game updates, particularly those in Early Access, can alter the impression of a game to users. To prevent observed abuse of the review system by developers or other third-party agents, Valve modified the review system in September 2016 to discount review scores for a game from users that activated the product through a product key rather than directly purchased by the Steam Store, though their reviews remain visible. Alongside this, Valve announced that it would end business relations with any developer or publisher that they have found to be abusing the review system. Separately, Valve has taken actions to minimize the effects of review bombs on Steam. In particular, Valve announced in March 2019 that it mark reviews they believe are "off-topic" as a result of a review bomb, and eliminate their contribution to summary review scores; the first such games they took action on with this was the Borderlands games after it was announced Borderlands 3 would be a timed-exclusive to the Epic Games Store.

During mid-2011, Valve began to offer free-to-play games, such as Global Agenda, Spiral Knights and Champions Online; this offer was linked to the company's move to make Team Fortress 2 a free-to-play title. Valve included support via Steamworks for microtransactions for in-game items in these games through Steam's purchasing channels, in a similar manner to the in-game store for Team Fortress 2. Later that year, Valve added the ability to trade in-game items and "unopened" game gifts between users. Steam Coupons, which was introduced in December 2011, provides single-use coupons that provide a discount to the cost of items. Steam Coupons can be provided to users by developers and publishers; users can trade these coupons between friends in a similar fashion to gifts and in-game items. In May 2015, GameStop began selling Steam Wallet cards. Steam Market, a feature introduced in beta in December 2012 that would allow users to sell virtual items to others via Steam Wallet funds, further extended the idea. Valve levies a transaction fee of 15% on such sales and game publishers that use Steam Market pay a transaction fee. For example, Team Fortress 2the first game supported at the beta phaseincurred both fees. Full support for other games was expected to be available in early 2013. In April 2013, Valve added subscription-based game support to Steam; the first game to use this service was Darkfall Unholy Wars.

In October 2012, Steam introduced non-gaming applications, which are sold through the service in the same manner as games. Creativity and productivity applications can access the core functions of the Steamworks API, allowing them to use Steam's simplified installation and updating process, and incorporate features including cloud saving and Steam Workshop. Steam also allows game soundtracks to be purchased to be played via Steam Music or integrated with the user's other media players. Valve adjusted its approach to soundtracks in 2020, no longer requiring them to be offered as DLC, meaning that users can buy soundtracks to games they do not own, and publishers can offer soundtracks to games not on Steam.

Valve have also added the ability for publishers to rent and sell digital movies via the service, with initially most being video game documentaries. Following Warner Bros. Entertainment offering the Mad Max films alongside the September 2015 release of the game based on the series, Lionsgate entered into agreement with Valve to rent over one hundred feature films from its catalog through Steam starting in April 2016, with more films following later. In March 2017, Crunchyroll started offering various anime for purchase or rent through Steam. However, by February 2019, Valve shuttered video from its storefront save for videos directly related to gaming content. While available, users could also purchase Steam Machine related hardware.

Valve received revenue share of a flat 30% from all direct Steam sales and transactions. The policy change was seen by journalists as trying to entice larger developers to stay with Steam rather than other digital storefronts like Origin or Uplay, while the decision was also met with backlash from indie and other small game developers, as their revenue split remained unchanged.

While Steam allows developers to offer demo versions of their games at any time, Valve worked with Geoff Keighley in 2019 in conjunction with The Game Awards to hold a week-long Steam Game Festival to feature a large selection of game demos of current and upcoming games, alongside sales for games already released. This event has since been repeated two or three times a year, typically in conjunction with game expositions or award events, and since has been renamed as the Steam Next Fest.

A Steam Points system and storefront was added in June 2020, which mirrored similar temporary points systems that had been used in prior sales on the storefront. Users earn points through purchases on Steam or by receiving community recognition for helpful reviews or discussion comments. These points do not expire as they had in the prior sales, and can be redeemed in the separate storefront for cosmetics that apply to the user's profile and chat interface.

Privacy, security and abuse 
The popularity of Steam has led to the service's being attacked by hackers. An attempt occurred in November 2011, when Valve temporarily closed the community forums, citing potential hacking threats to the service. Days later, Valve reported that the hack had compromised one of its customer databases, potentially allowing the perpetrators to access customer information; including encrypted password and credit card details. At that time, Valve was not aware whether the intruders actually accessed this information or discovered the encryption method, but nevertheless warned users to be alert for fraudulent activity.

Valve added Steam Guard functionality to the Steam client in March 2011 to protect against the hijacking of accounts via phishing schemes, one of the largest support problems Valve had at the time. Steam Guard was advertised to take advantage of the identity protection provided by Intel's second-generation Core processors and compatible motherboard hardware, which allows users to lock their account to a specific computer. Once locked, activity by that account on other computers must first be approved by the user on the locked computer. Support APIs for Steam Guard are available to third-party developers through Steamworks. Steam Guard also offers two-factor, risk-based authentication that uses a one-time verification code sent to a verified email address associated with the Steam account; this was later expanded to include two-factor authentication through the Steam mobile application, known as Steam Guard Mobile Authenticator. If Steam Guard is enabled, the verification code is sent each time the account is used from an unknown machine.

In 2015, between Steam-based game inventories, trading cards, and other virtual goods attached to a user's account, Valve stated that the potential monetary value had drawn hackers to try to access user accounts for financial benefit, and continue to encourage users to secure accounts with Steam Guard, when trading was introduced in 2011. Valve reported that in December 2015, around 77,000 accounts per month were hijacked, enabling the hijackers to empty out the user's inventory of items through the trading features. To improve security, the company announced that new restrictions would be added in March 2016, under which 15-day holds are placed on traded items unless they activate, and authenticate with Steam Guard Mobile Authenticator. After a Counter-Strike: Global Offensive gambling controversy, Valve stated it is cracking down on third-party websites using Steam inventory trading for Skin gambling in July 2016.

ReVuln, a commercial vulnerability research firm, published a paper in October 2012 that said the Steam browser protocol was posing a security risk by enabling malicious exploits through a simple user click on a maliciously crafted steam:// URL in a browser. This was the second serious vulnerability of gaming-related software following a recent problem with Ubisoft's own game distribution platform Uplay. German IT platform Heise online recommended strict separation of gaming and sensitive data, for example using a PC dedicated to gaming, gaming from a second Windows installation, or using a computer account with limited rights dedicated to gaming.

In July 2015, a bug in the software allowed anyone to reset the password to any account by using the "forgot password" function of the client. High-profile professional gamers and streamers lost access to their accounts. In December 2015, Steam's content delivery network was misconfigured in response to a DDoS attack, causing cached store pages containing personal information to be temporarily exposed for 34,000 users.

In April 2018, Valve added new privacy settings for Steam users, who are able to set if their current activity status is private, visible to friends only, or public; in addition to being able to hide their game lists, inventory, and other profile elements in a similar manner. While these changes brought Steam's privacy settings inline with approaches used by game console services, it also impacted third-party services such as Steam Spy, which relied on the public data to estimate Steam sales count.

Valve established a HackerOne bug bounty program in May 2018, a crowdsourced method to test and improve security features of the Steam client. In August 2019, a security researcher exposed a zero-day vulnerability in the Windows client of Steam, which allowed for any user to run arbitrary code with LocalSystem privileges using just a few simple commands. The vulnerability was then reported to Valve via the program, but it was initially rejected for being "out-of-scope". Following a second vulnerability found by the same user, Valve apologized and patched them both, and expanded the program's rules to accept any other similar problems in the future.

The Anti-Defamation League published a report that stated the Steam Community platform harbors hateful content in April 2020. In January 2021, a trading card glitch let players generate Steam Wallet funds from free Steam trading cards with bots using Capcom Arcade Stadium and other games, resulting in the game becoming one of the statistically most played titles.

User interface and functions 
Since November 2013, Steam has allowed for users to review their purchased games and organize them into categories set by the user and add to favorite lists for quick access.
Players can add non-Steam games to their libraries, allowing the game to be easily accessed from the Steam client and providing support where possible for Steam Overlay features. The Steam interface allows for user-defined shortcuts to be added. In this way, third-party modifications and games not purchased through the Steam Store can use Steam features. Valve sponsors and distributes some modifications free of charge; and modifications that use Steamworks can also use VAC, Friends, the server browser, and any Steam features supported by their parent game. For most games launched from Steam, the client provides an in-game overlay that can be accessed by a keystroke. From the overlay, the user can access his or her Steam Community lists and participate in chat, manage selected Steam settings, and access a built-in web browser without having to exit the game. Since the beginning of February 2011 as a beta version, the overlay also allows players to take screenshots of the games in process; it automatically stores these and allows the player to review, delete, or share them during or after his or her game session. As a full version on February 24, 2011, this feature was reimplemented so that users could share screenshots on websites of Facebook, Twitter, and Reddit straight from a user's screenshot manager.

Steam's "Big Picture" mode was announced in 2011; public betas started in September 2012 and were integrated into the software in December 2012. Big Picture mode is a 10-foot user interface, which optimizes the Steam display to work on high-definition televisions, allowing the user to control Steam with a gamepad or with a keyboard and mouse. Newell stated that Big Picture mode was a step towards a dedicated Steam entertainment hardware unit. With the introduction of the Steam Deck, Valve began pushing the new Big Picture mode based on the Steam Deck UI in beta testing in October 2022, and full release in February 2023.

In 2012, Valve announced Steam for Schools, a free function-limited version of the Steam client for schools. It was part of Valve's initiative to support gamification of learning for classroom instruction. It was released alongside free versions of Portal 2 and a standalone program called "Puzzle Maker" that allowed teachers and students to create and manipulate levels. It featured additional authentication security that allowed teachers to share and distribute content via a Steam Workshop-type interface, but blocks access from students.

In-Home Streaming was introduced in May 2014; it allows users to stream games installed on one computer to anotherregardless of platformon the same home network with low latency. By June 2019, Valve renamed this feature to Remote Play, allowing users to stream games across devices that may be outside of their home network. Steam's "Remote Play Together", added in November 2019 after a month of beta testing, gives the ability for local multiplayer games to be played by people in disparate locations, though will not necessary resolve latency problems typical of these types of games. Remote Play Together was expanded in February 2021 to give the ability to invite non-Steam players to play through a Steam Link app approach.

The Steam client, as part of a social network service, allows users to identify friends and join groups using the Steam Community feature. Through the Steam Chat feature, users can use text chat and peer-to-peer VoIP with other users, identify which games their friends and other group members are playing, and join and invite friends to Steamworks-based multiplayer games that support this feature. Users can participate in forums hosted by Valve to discuss Steam games. Each user has a unique page that shows his or her groups and friends, game library including earned achievements, game wishlists, and other social features; users can choose to keep this information private. In January 2010, Valve reported that 10 million of the 25 million active Steam accounts had signed up to Steam Community. In conjunction with the 2012 Steam Summer Sale, user profiles were updated with Badges reflecting the user's participation in the Steam community and past events. Steam Trading Cards, a system where players earn virtual trading cards based on games they own, were introduced in May 2013. Using them, players can trade with other Steam users on the Steam community Marketplace and use them to craft "Badges", which grant rewards such as game discount coupons, emoticons, and the ability to customize their user profile page. In 2010, the Steam client became an OpenID provider, allowing third-party websites to use a Steam user's identity without requiring the user to expose his or her Steam credentials. In order to prevent abuse, access to most community features is restricted until a one-time payment of at least 5 is made to Valve. This requirement can be fulfilled by making any purchase of five dollars or more on Steam, or by adding at the same amount to their wallet.

Through Steamworks, Steam provides a means of server browsing for multiplayer games that use the Steam Community features, allowing users to create lobbies with friends or members of common groups. Steamworks also provides Valve Anti-Cheat (VAC), Valve's proprietary anti-cheat system; game servers automatically detect and report users who are using cheats in online, multiplayer games. In August 2012, Valve added new featuresincluding dedicated hub pages for games that highlight the best user-created content, top forum posts, and screenshotsto the Community area. In December 2012, a feature where users can upload walkthroughs and guides detailing game strategy was added. Starting in January 2015, the Steam client allowed players to livestream to Steam friends or the public while playing games on the platform. For the main event of The International 2018 Dota 2 tournament, Valve launched Steam.tv as a major update to Steam Broadcasting, adding Steam chat and Steamworks integration for spectating matches played at the event. It has also been used for other events, such as a pre-release tournament for the digital card game Artifact and for The Game Awards 2018 and Steam Awards award shows.

In September 2014, Steam Music was added to the Steam client, allowing users to play through music stored on their computer or to stream from a locally networked computer directly in Steam. An update to the friends and chat system was released in July 2018, allowing for non-peer-to-peer chats integrated with voice chat and other features that were compared to Discord. A standalone mobile app based on this for Android and iOS was released in May 2019.

A major visual overhaul of the Library and game profile pages were released in October 2019. These redesigns are aimed to aid users to organize their games, help showcase what shared games a user's friends are playing, games that are being live-streamed, and new content that may be available, along with more customization options for sorting games. Associated with that, Valve gave developers means of communicating when special in-game events are approaching through Steam Events, which appear to players on the revamped Library and game profile pages.

Developer features 
Valve provides developers the ability to create storefront pages for games ahead of time to help generate interest in their game ahead of release. This is also necessary to fix a release date that functions into Valve's "build review", a free service performed by Valve about a week before this release date to make sure the game can be installed and run, and other checks to make sure the game's launch is otherwise trouble-free. Updates in 2020 to Discovery queues have given developers more options for customizing their storefront page and how these pages integration with users' experiences with the Steam client.

Valve offers Steamworks, an application programming interface (API) that provides development and publishing tools to take advantage of Steam client's features, free-of-charge to game and software developers. Steamworks provides networking and player authentication tools for both server and peer-to-peer multiplayer games, matchmaking services, support for Steam community friends and groups, Steam statistics and achievements, integrated voice communications, and Steam Cloud support, allowing games to integrate with the Steam client. The API also provides anti-cheating devices and digital copy management. In 2016, after introducing the Steam Controller and improvements to the Steam interface to support numerous customization options, the Steamworks API was also updated to provide a generic controller library for developers and these customization features for other third-party controllers, starting with the DualShock 4. Steam's Input API has since been updated to include official support for other console controllers such as the Nintendo Switch Pro Controller in 2018, the Xbox Wireless Controller for the Xbox Series X and Series S consoles, and the PlayStation 5's DualSense, as well as compatible controllers from third-party manufacturers in 2020. In November 2020, Valve said the controller usage had more than doubled over the past 2 years. In March 2019, Steam's game server network was opened to third party developers.

Developers of software available on Steam are able to track sales of their games through the Steam store. In February 2014, Valve announced that it would begin to allow developers to set up their own sales for their games independent of any sales that Valve may set. Valve may also work with developers to suggest their participation in sales on themed days.

Steam conducts and partially publishes a monthly opt-in hardware and software survey since 2007 and 2010.

Valve added the ability for developers to sell games under an early access model with a special section of the Steam store, starting in March 2013. This program allows for developers to release functional, but not finished, products such as beta versions to the service to allow users to buy the games and help provide testing and feedback towards the final production. Early access also helps to provide funding to the developers to help complete their games. The early access approach allowed more developers to publish games onto the Steam service without the need for Valve's direct curation of games, significantly increasing the number of available games on the service.

Developers are able to request Steam keys of their products to use as they see fit, such as to give away in promotions, to provide to selected users for review, or to give to key resellers for different profitization. Valve generally honors all such requests, but clarified that they would evaluate some requests to avoid giving keys to games or other offerings that are designed to manipulate the Steam storefront and other features. For example, Valve said that a request for 500,000 keys for a game that has significantly negative reviews and 1,000 sales on Steam is unlikely to be granted.

Valve enabled the ability for multiple developers to create bundles of games from their offerings without the need for Valve's staff to create these on their behalf in June 2021.

Steam Workshop 
The Steam Workshop is a Steam account-based hosting service for videogame user-created content. Depending on the title, new levels, art assets, gameplay modifications, or other content may be published to or installed from the Steam Workshop through an automated, online account-based process. The Workshop was originally used for distribution of new items for Team Fortress 2; it was redesigned to extend support for any game in early 2012, including modifications for The Elder Scrolls V: Skyrim. A May 2012 patch for Portal 2, enabled by a new map-making tool through the Steam Workshop, introduced the ability to share user-created levels. Independently developed games, including Dungeons of Dredmor, are able to provide Steam Workshop support for user-generated content. Dota 2 became Valve's third published title available for the Steam Workshop in June 2012; its features include customizable accessories, character skins, and announcer packs. Workshop content may be monetized; Newell said that the Workshop was inspired by gold farming from World of Warcraft to find a way to incentive both players and content creators in video games, and which had informed them of their approach to Team Fortress 2 and their later multiplayer games.

By January 2015, Valve themselves had provided some user-developed Workshop content as paid-for features in Valve-developed games, including Team Fortress 2 and Dota 2; with over $57 million being paid to content creators using the Workshop. Valve began allowing developers to use these advanced features in January 2015; both the developer and content generator share the profits of the sale of these items; the feature went live in April 2015, starting with various mods for Skyrim. This feature was pulled a few days afterward following negative user feedback and reports of pricing and copyright misuse. Six months later, Valve stated they were still interested in offering this type of functionality in the future, but would review the implementation to avoid these previous mistakes. In November 2015, the Steam client was updated with the ability for game developers to offer in-game items for direct sale via the store interface, with Rust being the first game to use the feature.

SteamVR
SteamVR is a virtual reality hardware and software platform developed by Valve, with a focus on allowing "room-scale" experiences using positional tracking base stations, as opposed to those requiring the player to stay in a singular location. SteamVR was first introduced for the Oculus Rift headset in 2014, and later expanded to support other virtual reality headsets, such as the HTC Vive and Valve Index. Initially released for support on Windows, macOS, and Linux, Valve dropped macOS support for SteamVR in May 2020.

Storefront curation 
Up until 2012, Valve would handpick games to be included onto the Steam service, limiting these to games that either had a major developer supporting them, or smaller studios with proven track records for Valve's purposes. Since then, Valve have sought ways to enable more games to be offered through Steam, while pulling away from manually approving games for the service, short of validating that a game runs on the platforms the publisher had indicated. In 2017, Steam development team member Alden Kroll said that Valve knows Steam is in a near-monopoly for game sales on personal computers, and the company does not want to be in a position to determine what gets sold, and thus had tried to find ways to make the process of adding games to Steam outside of their control. At the same time, Valve recognized that unfettered control of games onto the service can lead to discovery problems as well as low-quality games that are put onto the service for financial gain.

Steam Greenlight 
Valve announced Steam Greenlight to streamline game addition to the service in July 2012 and released the following month. Through Greenlight, Steam users would choose which games were added to the service. Developers were able to submit information about their games, as well as early builds or beta versions, for consideration by users. Users would pledge support for these games, and Valve would help to make top-pledged games available on the Steam service. In response to complaints during its first week that finding games to support was made difficult by a flood of inappropriate or false submissions, Valve required developers to pay  to list a game on the service to reduce illegitimate submissions. Those fees were donated to the charity Child's Play. This fee was met with some concern from smaller developers, who often are already working in a deficit and may not have the money to cover such fees. A later modification allowed developers to put conceptual ideas on the Greenlight service to garner interest in potential projects free-of-charge; votes from such projects are visible only to the developer. Valve also allowed non-gaming software to be voted onto the service through Greenlight.

The initial process offered by Greenlight was panned by developers because while they favored the concept, the rate of games that were eventually approved were small. Valve acknowledged that this was a problem and believed it could be improved upon. In January 2013, Newell stated that Valve recognized that its role in Greenlight was perceived as a bottleneck, something the company was planning to eliminate in the future through an open marketplace infrastructure. On the eve of Greenlight's first anniversary, Valve simultaneously approved 100 games through the Greenlight process to demonstrate this change of direction. While the Greenlight service had helped to bring more and varied games onto Steam without excessive bureaucracy, it also led to an excessively large number of games on the service that make it difficult for a single one to stand out. By 2014, Valve had discussed plans to phase out Greenlight in favor of providing developers with easier means to put their games onto Steam.

Steam Direct 
Steam Greenlight was phased out and replaced with Steam Direct in June 2017. With Steam Direct, a developer or publisher wishing to distribute their game on Steam needs only to complete appropriate identification and tax forms for Valve and then pay a recoupable application fee for each game they intend to publish. Once they apply, a developer must wait thirty days before publishing the game as to give Valve the ability to review the game to make sure it is "configured correctly, matches the description provided on the store page, and doesn't contain malicious content".

On announcing its plans for Steam Direct, Valve suggested the fee would be in the range of $100–5,000, meant to encourage earnest software submissions to the service and weed out poor quality games that are treated as shovelware, improving the discovery pipeline to Steam's customers. Smaller developers raised concerns about the Direct fee harming them, and excluding potentially good indie games from reaching the Steam store. Valve opted to set the Direct fee at $100 after reviewing concerns from the community, recognizing the need to keep this at a low amount for small developers, and outlining plans to improve their discovery algorithms and inject more human involvement to help these. Valve then refunds the fee should the game exceed $1,000 in sales. In the process of transitioning from Greenlight to Direct, Valve mass-approved most of the 3,400 remaining games that were still in Greenlight, though the company noted that not all of these were at a state to be published. Valve anticipated that the volume of new games added to the service would further increase with Direct in place. Some groups, such as publisher Raw Fury and crowd funding/investment site Fig, have offered to pay the Direct fee for indie developers who can not afford it.

Games discovery changes 
Without more direct interaction on the curation process, allowing hundreds more games on the service, Valve had looked to find methods to allow players to find games they would be more likely to buy based on previous purchase patterns. The September 2014 "Discovery Update" added tools that would allow existing Steam users to be curators for game recommendations, and sorting functions that presented more popular games and recommended games specific to the user, as to allow more games to be introduced on Steam without the need of Steam Greenlight, while providing some means to highlight user-recommended games. This Discovery update was considered successful by Valve, as they reported in March 2015 in seeing increased use of the Steam Storefront and an increase in 18% of sales by revenue from just prior to the update. A second Discovery update was released November 2016, giving users more control over what games they want to see or ignore within the Steam Store, alongside tools for developers and publishers to better customize and present their game within these new users preferences.

By February 2017, Valve reported that with the second Discovery update, the number of games shown to users via the store's front page increased by 42%, with more conversions into sales from that viewership. In 2016, more games are meeting a rough metric of success defined by Valve as selling more than $200,000 in revenues in its first 90 days of release. Valve added a "Curator Connect" program in December 2017. Curators can set up descriptors for the type of games they are interested in, preferred languages, and other tags along with social media profiles, while developers can find and reach out to specific curators from this information, and, after review, provide them directly with access to their game. This step, which eliminates the use of a Steam redemption key, is aimed to reduce the reselling of keys, as well as dissuade users that may be trying to game the curator system to obtain free game keys.

Valve has attempted to deal with "fake games", those that are built around reused assets and little other innovation, designed to misuse Steam's features for the benefit only to the developer or select few users. To help assist finding and removing these games from the service, the company added Steam Explorers atop its existing Steam Curator program, according to various YouTube personalities that have spoken out about such games in the past and with Valve directly, including Jim Sterling and TotalBiscuit. Any Steam user is able to sign up to be an Explorer, and are asked to look at under-performing games on the service as to either vouch that the game is truly original and simply lost among other releases, or if it is an example of a "fake game", at which point Valve can take action to remove the game.

In July 2019, the Steam Labs feature was introduced as a means of Valve to showcase experimental discovery features they have considered for including into Steam, but seek public feedback to see if it is something that users want before fully integrating that into the storefront. For example, an initial experiment released at launch was the Interactive Recommender, which uses artificial intelligence algorithms pulling data from the user's past gameplay history, comparing it to all other users, as to suggest new games that may be of interest to them. As these experiments mature through end-user testing, they have then been brought into the storefront as direct features.

The September 2019 Discovery update, which Valve claimed would improve the visibility of niche and lesser-known games, was met with criticism from some indie game developers, who recorded a significant drop in exposure of their games, including new wishlist additions and appearances in the "More Like This" and "Discovery queue" sections of the store.

Steam Charts were introduced in September 2022 and publicly track the storefront's best-selling and most-played games, including historically by week and month. Charts replaced a previous statistics page to be more comprehensive, and features content that had previously been part of third-party websites including SteamSpy, SteamDB, and SteamCharts.

Games and account policies 
In June 2015, Valve created a formal process to allow purchasers to request full refunds on games they had purchased on Steam for any reason, with refunds guaranteed within the first two weeks as long as the player had not spent more than two hours in the game. Prior to June 2015, Valve had a no-refunds policy, but allowed them in certain circumstances, such as if third-party content had failed to work or improperly reports on certain features. For example, the Steam version of From Dust was originally stated to have a single, post-installation online DRM check with its publisher Ubisoft, but the released version of the game required a DRM check with Ubisoft's servers each time it was used. At the request of Ubisoft, Valve offered refunds to customers who bought the game while Ubisoft worked to release a patch that would remove the DRM check altogether. On The War Z release, players found that the game was still in an alpha-build state and lacked many of the features advertised on its Steam store page. Though the developers Hammerpoint Interactive altered the description after launch to reflect the current state of the game software, Valve removed the title from Steam and offered refunds to those who had bought it. Valve also removed Earth: Year 2066 from the Early Access program and offered refunds after discovering that the game's developers had reused assets from other games and used developer tools to erase negative complaints about the title. Valve stated it would continue to work on improving the discovery process for users, taking principles they learned in providing transparency for matchmaking in Dota 2 to make the process better, and using that towards Steam storefront procedures to help refine their algorithms with user feedback.

Valve has full authority to remove games from the service for various reasons; however games that are removed can still be downloaded and played by those that have already purchased these games. Another reason would be games that have had their licenses expired may no longer be sold, such as when a number of Transformers games published by Activision under license from Hasbro were removed from the store in January 2018. Grand Theft Auto: Vice City was removed from Steam in 2012 because of a claim from the Recording Industry Association of America over an expired license for one of the songs on the soundtrack. Around the launch of Electronic Arts' (EA) own digital storefront Origin during the same year, Valve removed Crysis 2, Dragon Age II, and Alice: Madness Returns from Steam because the terms of service prevented games from having their own in-game storefront for downloadable content. In the case of Crysis 2, a "Maximum Edition" that contained all the available downloadable content for the game and removed the in-game storefront was re-added to Steam. Valve also remove games that are formally stated to be violating copyright or other intellectual property when given such complaints. In 2016, Valve removed Orion by Trek Industries when Activision filed a Digital Millennium Copyright Act (DMCA) complaint about the game after it was discovered that one of the game's artists had taken, among other assets, gun models directly from Call of Duty: Black Ops 3 and Call of Duty: Advanced Warfare.

Quality control 
With the launch of Steam Direct, effectively removing any curation of games by Valve prior to being published on Steam, there have been several incidents of published games that have attempted to mislead Steam users. Starting in June 2018, Valve has taken actions against games and developers that are "trolling" the system; in September 2018, Valve explicitly defined that trolls on Steam "aren't actually interested in good faith efforts to make and sell games to you or anyone" and instead use "game shaped object" that could be considered a video game but would not be considered "good" by a near-unanimity of users. As an example, Valve's Lombardi stated that the game Active Shooter, which would have allowed the player to play as either a SWAT team member tasked to take down the shooter at a school shooting incident or as the shooter themselves, was an example of trolling, as he described it was "designed to do nothing but generate outrage and cause conflict through its existence". While Active Shooter had been removed from Steam prior to Valve issuing this policy statement under the reasoning that the development had abused the Steam service's terms and conditions, Lombardi asserted that they would have removed the game if it had been offered by any other developer. A day after making this new policy, Valve subsequently removed four yet-released games from the service that appeared to also be created to purposely create outrage, including AIDS Simulator and ISIS Simulator. Within a month of clarifying its definition of trolling, Valve removed approximately 170 games from Steam.

In addition to removing bad actors from the service, Valve has also taken steps to reduce the impact of "fake games" and their misuse on the service. In May 2017, Valve identified that there were several games on the service with trading card support, where the developer distributed game codes to thousands of bot-operated accounts that would run the game to earn trading cards that they could then sell for profit; these games would also create false positives that make these games appear more popular than they really were and would impact games suggested to legitimate players through their store algorithms, affecting Steam's Discovery algorithms. Subsequent to this patch, games must reach some type of confidence factor based on actual playtime before they can generate trading cards, with players credited for their time played towards receiving trading cards before this metric is met. Valve identified a similar situation in June 2018 with "fake games" that offered large numbers of game achievements with little gameplay aspects, which some users would use to artificially raise their global achievement statistics displayed on their profile. Valve plans to use the same approach and algorithms to identify these types of games, limiting these games to only one thousand total achievements and discounting these achievements towards a user's statistics. These algorithms have resulted in select false positives for legitimate games with unusual end-user usage patterns, such as Wandersong which was flagged in January 2019 for what the developer believed was related to a near unanimous positive users reviews from the game.

Other actions taken by developers against the terms of service or other policies have prompted Valve to remove games. Some noted examples include:

 In September 2016, Valve removed Digital Homicide Studios games from the storefront for being "hostile to Steam customers" following a lawsuit that the developer had issued against 100 unnamed Steam users for leaving negative reviews of their games. Digital Homicide later dropped the lawsuit, in part due to the removal of the games from Steam affecting their financial ability to proceed with the lawsuit.
 In September 2017, Valve removed 170 games developed by Silicon Echo (operating under several different names) that they had released over a period of a few months in 2017, after the implementation of Steam Direct. Valve cited that these were cheap "fake games" that relied on "asset flipping" with pre-existing Unity game engine assets so that they could be published quickly, and were designed to take advantage of the trading card market to allow players and the developers to profit from the trading card sales.
 In February 2018, after discovering that the CEO of Insel Games had requested the company's employees to write positive Steam reviews for its games as to manipulate the review scores, Valve removed all of Insel's games from the service and banned the company from it.
 In July 2018, the games Abstractism and Climber offered Steam inventory items that used assets from other Valve games, which were used to mislead users looking for these for trading. Valve removed the games, and built in additional trade protections, warning users of trades involving recently released games or games they do not own to prevent such scamming.
 In November 2019, nearly 1000 games were removed from Steam. Most appeared tied to a Russian publisher that had operated under several different names. A Valve representative stated that they "recently discovered a handful of partners that were abusing some Steamworks tools" as rationale for the removals.
 Developers stated that Valve began warning them about removal of games that used cryptocurrencies and non-fungible tokens in October 2021, as such items could have real-world value outside of the game or Steam, which would be against Valve's acceptable use policy.

Mature content 
Valve has also removed or threatened to remove games due to inappropriate or mature content, though there was often confusion as to what material qualified for this, such as a number of mature, but non-pornographic visual novels being threatened. For example, Eek Games' House Party included scenes of nudity and sexual encounters in its original release, which drew criticism from conservative religious organization National Center on Sexual Exploitation, leading Valve to remove the title from the service. Eek Games were later able to satisfy Valve's standards by including censor bars within the game and allowing the game to be readded to Steam, though offered a patch on their website to remove the bars. In May 2018, several developers of anime-stylized games that contained some light nudity, such as HuniePop, were told by Valve they had to address sexual content within their games or face removal from Steam, leading to questions of inconsistent application of Valve's policies. The National Center on Sexual Exploitation took credit for convincing Valve to target these games. However, Valve later rescinded its orders, allowing these games to remain and telling the developers Valve would re-evaluate the games and inform them of any content that would need to be changed or removed.

In June 2018, Valve clarified its policy on content, taking a more hands-off approach rather than deem what content is inappropriate, outside of illegal material. Rather than trying to make decisions themselves on what content is appropriate, Valve enhanced its filtering system to allow developers and publishers to indicate and justify the types of mature content (including violence, nudity, and sexual content) in their games. Users can block games that are marked with this type of content from appearing in the store, and if they have not blocked it, they are presented with the description given by the developer or publisher before they can continue to the store page. Developers and publishers with existing games on Steam have been strongly encouraged to complete these forms for these games, while Valve will use moderators to make sure new games are appropriately marked. Valve also committed to developing anti-harassment tools to support developers who may find their game amid controversy.

Until these tools were in place, some adult-themed games were delayed for release. Negligee: Love Stories developed by Dharker Studios was one of the first sexually explicit games to be offered after the introduction of the tools in September 2018. Dharker noted that in discussions with Valve that they would be liable for any content-related fines or penalties that countries may place on Valve, a clause of their publishing contract for Steam, and took steps to restrict sale of the game in over 20 regions. Games that feature mature themes with primary characters that visually appear to be underaged, even if the game's narrative establishes them as adults, have been banned by Valve.

In March 2019, Valve faced pressure over Rape Day, a planned game described as being a dark comedy and power fantasy where the player would control a serial rapist in the midst of a zombie apocalypse. Journalists questioned how the hands-off approach would handle this case; Valve ultimately decided against offering the game on Steam, arguing that while it "[respects] developers' desire to express themselves", there were "costs and risks" associated with the game's content, and the developers had "chosen content matter and a way of representing it that makes it very difficult for us to help them [find an audience]".

Platforms and devices

Microsoft Windows client 
Steam originally released exclusively for Microsoft Windows in 2003, but has since been ported to other platforms. More recent Steam client versions use the Chromium Embedded Framework. To take advantage of some of its features for newer interface elements, Steam uses 64-bit versions of Chromium, which makes it unsupported on older operating systems such as Windows XP and Windows Vista. Steam on Windows also relies on some security features built into later versions of Windows. Steam support for XP and Vista were dropped in 2019. While users still on those operating systems are able to use the client, they do not have access to newer features. Around only 0.2% of Steam users were affected by this when it began.

macOS client 
On March 8, 2010, Valve announced a client for Mac OS X. The announcement was preceded by a change in the Steam beta client to support the cross-platform WebKit web browser rendering engine instead of the Trident engine of Internet Explorer. Before this announcement, Valve teased the release by e-mailing several images to Mac community and gaming websites; the images featured characters from Valve games with Apple logos and parodies of vintage Macintosh advertisements. Valve developed a full video homage to Apple's 1984 Macintosh commercial to announce the availability of Half-Life 2 and its episodes on the service; some concept images for the video had previously been used to tease the Mac Steam client.

Steam for Mac OS X was originally planned for release in April 2010; but was pushed back to May 12, 2010, following a beta period. In addition to the Steam client, several features were made available to developers, allowing them to take advantage of the cross-platform Source engine, and platform and network capabilities using Steamworks. Through SteamPlay, the macOS client allows players who have purchased compatible products in the Windows version to download the Mac versions at no cost, allowing them to continue playing the game on the other platform. Some third-party games may require the user to re-purchase them to gain access to the cross-platform functionality. The Steam Cloud, along with many multiplayer PC games, also supports cross-platform play, allowing Windows, macOS, and Linux users to play with each other regardless of platform.

Linux client and SteamOS 
Valve announced in July 2012 that it was developing a Steam client for Linux and modifying the Source engine to work natively on Linux, based on the Ubuntu distribution. This announcement followed months of speculation, primarily from the website Phoronix that had discovered evidence of Linux developing in recent builds of Steam and other Valve games. Newell stated that getting Steam and games to work on Linux is a key strategy for Valve; Newell called the closed nature of Microsoft Windows 8 "a catastrophe for everyone in the PC space", and that Linux would maintain "the openness of the platform". Valve is extending support to any developers that want to bring their games to Linux, by "making it as easy as possible for anybody who's engaged with usputting their games on Steam and getting those running on Linux", according to Newell.

The team developing the Linux client had been working for a year before the announcement to validate that such a port would be possible. As of the official announcement, a near-feature-complete Steam client for Linux had been developed and successfully run on Ubuntu. Internal beta testing of the Linux client started in October 2012; external beta testing occurred in early November the same year. Open beta clients for Linux were made available in late December 2012, and the client was officially released in mid-February 2013. At the time of announcement, Valve's Linux division assured that its first game on the OS, Left 4 Dead 2, would run at an acceptable frame rate and with a degree of connectivity with the Windows and Mac OS X versions. From there, it began working on porting other games to Ubuntu and expanding to other Linux distributions. Linux games are also eligible for SteamPlay availability. Versions of Steam working under Fedora and Red Hat Enterprise Linux were released by October 2013. The number of Linux-compatible games on Steam increased from over 500 in June 2014, to over 1,000 by March 2015 and to over 2,000 in March 2016. In February 2019, Steam for Linux had 5,800 native games compared to over 30,000 including aforementioned and was described as having "the power to keep Linux [gaming] alive" by Engadget.

In August 2018, Valve released a beta version of Proton, an open-source Windows compatibility layer for Linux, so that Linux users could run Windows games directly through Steam for Linux, removing the need to install the Windows version of Steam in Wine. Proton is composed of a set of open-source tools including Wine and DXVK among others. The software allows the use of Steam-supported controllers, even those not compatible with Windows. Released in February 2022, Valve's handheld computer, the Steam Deck, runs SteamOS 3.0 which is based on the Arch Linux distribution, and uses Proton to support Windows-based games without native Linux ports. To that end, Valve worked with various middleware developers to make sure their tools were compatible with Proton on Linux and maximize the number of games that the Steam Deck - and by extension other Linux-based installations - would support. This included working with various anti-cheat developers such as Easy Anti-Cheat and BattlEye to make sure their solutions worked with Proton. To help with compatibility, Valve developed a classification system that they will populate to rank any game as to how well it works as a Linux native solution or through Proton.

Support for Nvidia's proprietary deep learning super sampling (DLSS) on supported video cards and games was added to Proton in June 2021, though this is not available on the Steam Deck which is based on AMD hardware.

Steamworks on consoles 
At E3 2010, Newell announced that Steamworks would arrive on the PlayStation 3 with Portal 2. It would provide automatic updates, community support, downloadable content and other unannounced features. Steamworks made its debut on consoles with Portal 2 PlayStation 3 release. Several featuresincluding cross-platform play and instant messaging, Steam Cloud for saved games, and the ability for PS3 owners to download Portal 2 from Steam (Windows and Mac) at no extra costwere offered. Valve's Counter-Strike: Global Offensive also supports Steamworks and cross-platform features on the PlayStation 3, including using keyboard and mouse controls as an alternative to the gamepad. Valve said it "hope[s] to expand upon this foundation with more Steam features and functionality in DLC and future content releases".

The Xbox 360 does not have support for Steamworks. Newell said that they would have liked to bring the service to the console through the game Counter-Strike: Global Offensive, which would have allowed Valve to provide the same feature set that it did for the PlayStation 3, but later said that cross-platform play would not be present in the final version of the game. Valve attributes the inability to use Steamworks on the Xbox 360 to limitations in the Xbox Live regulations of the ability to deliver patches and new content. Valve's Erik Johnson stated that Microsoft required new content on the console to be certified and validated before distribution, which would limit the usefulness of Steamworks' delivery approach.

Mobile apps 
Valve released an official Steam client for iOS and Android devices in late January 2012, following a short beta period. The application allows players to log into their accounts to browse the storefront, manage their games, and communicate with friends in the Steam community. The application also incorporates a two-factor authentication system that works with Steam Guard, further enhancing the security of a user's account. Newell stated that the application was a strong request from Steam users and sees it as a means "to make [Steam] richer and more accessible for everyone". A mobile Steam client for Windows Phone devices was released in June 2016. In May 2019, a mobile chat-only client for Steam was released under the name Steam Chat.

On May 14, 2018, a "Steam Link" app with remote play features was released in beta to allow users to stream games to Android phones, named after discontinued set-top box Steam Link. It was also submitted to the iOS App Store, but was denied by Apple Inc., who cited "business conflicts with app guidelines". Apple later clarified its rule at the following Apple Worldwide Developers Conference in early June, in that iOS apps may not offer an app-like purchasing store, but does not restrict apps that provide remote desktop support that would allow users to purchase content through the remote desktop. In response, Valve removed the ability to purchase games or other content through the app and resubmitted it for approval in June 2018, where it was accepted by Apple and allowed on their store in May 2019.

Steam-branded devices
Prior to 2013, industry analysts believed that Valve was developing hardware and tuning features of Steam with apparent use on its own hardware. These computers were pre-emptively dubbed as "Steam Boxes" by the gaming community and expected to be a dedicated machine focused upon Steam functionality and maintaining the core functionality of a traditional video game console. In September 2013, Valve unveiled SteamOS, a custom Linux-based operating system they had developed specifically aimed for running Steam and games, and the final concept of the Steam Machine hardware. Unlike other consoles, the Steam Machine does not have set hardware; its technology is implemented at the discretion of the manufacturer and is fully customizable, much like a personal computer. In 2018 the Steam Machines were removed from the storefront due to low sales and small user traffic.

In November 2015, Valve released the set-top box Steam Link and Steam Controller (which was discontinued in 2019). The Steam Link removed the need for HDMI cables for displaying a PC's screen and allowed for wireless connection when connecting to a TV. That was discontinued in 2018, but now "Steam Link" refers to the Remote Play mobile app that allows users to stream content, such as games, from a PC to a mobile device over a network.

Valve released the Steam Deck, a handheld gaming computer running an updated version of SteamOS, with initial shipments starting on February 25, 2022. The Deck is designed for the play of Steam games, but can be placed into a separate dock, purchased separately, that allows the Deck to output to an external display and use the dock's power, networking, and connected USB accessories. The Deck was released on February 25, 2022. Among updates to Steam and SteamOS included better Proton layer support for Windows-based games, improved user interface features in the Steam client for the Steam Deck display, and adding Dynamic Cloud Saves to Steam to allow synchronizing saved games while a game is being played. Valve began marking all games on the service through a Steam Deck Validated program to indicate how compatible they were with the Steam Deck software.

Chromebooks
In March 2022, Google offered a prerelease version of Steam on Chromebooks, and entered public beta in November 2022.

Steam Cloud Play
Valve included beta support for Steam Cloud Play in May 2020 for developers to allow users to play games in their library which developers and publishers have opted to allow in a cloud gaming service. At launch, Steam Cloud Play only worked through Nvidia's GeForce Now service and would link up to other cloud services in the future though whether Valve would run its own cloud gaming service was unclear.

Steam China 

China has strict regulations on video games and Internet use; however, access to Steam is allowed through China's governmental firewalls. Currently, a large portion of Steam users are from China. By November 2017, more than half of the Steam userbase was fluent in Chinese, an effect created by the large popularity of Dota 2 and PlayerUnknown's Battlegrounds in the country, and several developers have reported that Chinese players make up close to 30% of the total players for their games.

Following a Chinese government-ordered temporary block of many of Steam's functions in December 2017, Valve and Perfect World announced they would help to provide an officially sanctioned version of Steam that meets Chinese Internet requirements. Perfect World has worked with Valve before to help bring Dota 2 and Counter-Strike: Global Offensive to the country through approved government processes. All games to be released on Steam China are expected to pass through the government approval process and meet other governmental requirements for operation, such as requiring a Chinese company to run any game with an online presence.

The platform is known locally as "Steam Platform" and runs independently from the rest of Steam. It was made to comply with China's strict regulations on video games, featuring only those that have passed approval by their government. Valve does not plan to prevent Chinese users from accessing the global Steam platform and will try to assure that a player's cloud data remains usable between the two. The client launched as an open beta on February 9, 2021, with about 40 games available at launch. As of December 2021, only around 100 games that have been reviewed and licensed by the government are available through Steam China.

On 25 December 2021, reports emerged that Steam's global service was the target of a domain name system attack that prevented users in China from accessing its site. The Ministry of Industry and Information Technology (MIIT) later confirmed that Chinese gamers would no longer be able to use Steam's global service as its international domain name has been designated as "illegal" due to "illicit activities" which were unspecified. The block has effectively locked all Chinese users out of games they had purchased through Steam's international service, and that they would only be able to go through Steam's China-specific application.

Reception and impact

Users 
Valve reported that there were 125 million active accounts on Steam by the end of 2015. By August 2017, the company reported that there were 27 million new active accounts since January 2016, bringing the total number of active users to at least 150 million. Most accounts were from North America and Western Europe, with there being a significant growth in accounts from Asian countries around 2017, spurred by their work to help localize the client and make additional currency options available to purchasers. In 2017, Tim Colwill opinionated for Polygon that some users show a so called "Good Guy Valve" attitude towards the company.

Valve also considers the concurrent user count a key indicator of the success of the platform, reflecting how many accounts were logged into Steam at the same time. By August 2017, Valve reported that they saw a peak of 14 million concurrent players, up from 8.4 million in 2015, with 33 million concurrent players each day and 67 million each month. By January 2018, the peak online count had reached 18.5 million, with over 47 million daily active users. During the coronavirus pandemic in 2020, in which a large proportion of the world's population were encouraged or forced to stay at home, Steam saw a concurrent player count of over 23 million in March, along with several games seeing similar record-breaking concurrent counts. The figure was broken again in January 2021 with over 25 million users shortly after the release of the highly anticipated game Cyberpunk 2077, itself the first single-player game on the service to have over a million concurrent players. Researchers have used crowdsourced feedback from Steam reviews for educational games.

Sales and distribution 

Steam has grown from seven games in 2004 to over 30,000 by 2019, with additional non-gaming products, such as creation software, DLC, and videos, numbering over 20,000. The growth of games on Steam is attributed to changes in Valve's curation approach, which allows publishers to add games without having Valve's direct involvement enabled by the Greenlight and early access models, and games supporting virtual reality technology.

Although Steam provides direct sales data to a game's developer and publisher, it does not provide any public sales data or provide such data to third-party sales groups like NPD Group. In 2011, Valve's Jason Holtman stated that the company felt that such sales data was outdated for a digital market, since such data, used in aggregate from other sources, could lead to inaccurate conclusions. Data that Valve does provide cannot be released without permission because of a non-disclosure agreement with Valve.

Developers and publishers have expressed the need to have some metrics of sales for games on Steam, as this allows them to judge the potential success of a title by reviewing how similar games had performed. This led to the creation of algorithms that worked on publicly available data through user profiles to estimate sales data with some accuracy, which led to the creation of the website Steam Spy in 2015. Steam Spy was credited with being reasonably accurate, but in April 2018, Valve added its new privacy settings that defaulted to hiding user game profiles by default, stating this was part of compliance with the General Data Protection Regulation (GDPR) in the European Union. The change broke the method Steam Spy had collected data, rendering it unusable. A few months later, another method had been developed using game achievements to estimate sales with similar accuracy, but Valve shortly changed the Steam API that reduced the functionality of this service. Some have asserted that Valve used the GDPR change as a means to block methods of estimating sales data, though Valve has since promised to provide tools to developers to help gain such insights that they say will be more accurate than Steam Spy was. In 2020, Simon Carless revised an approach originally proposed by Mike Boxleiter as early as 2013, with Carless's method used to estimate sales of a game based on the number of reviews it has on Steam based on a modified "Boxlieter number" used as a multiplication factor.

In November 2011, CD Projekt, the developer of The Witcher 2: Assassins of Kings, revealed that Steam was responsible for 200,000 (80%) of the 250,000 online sales of the game. Steam was responsible for 58.6% of gross revenue for Defender's Quest during its first three months of release across six digital distribution platformscomprising four major digital game distributors and two methods of purchasing and downloading the game directly from the developer. In September 2014, 1.4 million accounts belonged to Australian users; this grew to 2.2 million by October 2015. Steam's success has led to some criticism because of its support of DRM and for being an effective monopoly. In 2012, Free Software Foundation founder Richard Stallman called DRM using Steam on Linux is "unethical", but still better than Windows.

Steam's customer service has been highly criticized, with users citing poor response times or lack of response in regards to problems such as being locked out of one's library or having a non-working game redemption key. In March 2015, Valve had been given a failing "F" grade from the Better Business Bureau due to a large number of complaints in Valve's handling of Steam, leading Valve's Erik Johnson to state that "we don't feel like our customer service support is where it needs to be right now". Johnson stated the company plans to better integrate customer support features into the Steam client and be more responsive to such problems. In May 2017, in addition to hiring more staff for customer service, Valve publicized pages that show the number and type of customer service requests it was handling over the last 90 days, with an average of 75,000 entered each day. Of those, requests for refunds were the largest segment, and which Valve could resolve within hours, followed by account security and recovery requests. Valve stated at this time that 98% of all service requests were processed within 24 hours of filing.

Curation impact 

The addition of Greenlight and Direct have accelerated the number of games present on the service, with almost 40% of the 19,000 games on Steam by the end of 2017 having been released in 2017. By the end of 2018, over 27,000 games had been released on Steam, and had reached over 34,000 by the end of 2019. More than 50,000 games were on the service as of February 2021. Prior to Greenlight, Valve saw about five new games published each week. Greenlight expanded this to about 70 per week, and which doubled to 180 per week following the introduction of Direct. The accessiblity of publishing games on digital storefronts like Steam since its launch has been described as key to the popularity of indie games. As these processes allow developers to publish games on Steam with minimal oversight from Valve, journalists have criticized Valve for lacking curation policies that make it difficult to find quality games among poorly produced games, aka "shovelware".

Following the launch of Steam Direct, allowing games to be published without Valve's curation, members of the video game industry were split on Valve's hands-off approach. Some praised Valve in favoring to avoid trying to be a moral adjudicator of content and letting consumers decide what content they want to see, while others felt that this would encourage some developers to publish games on Steam that are purposely hateful or degenerate of some social classes, like LGBTQ, and that Valve's reliance on user filters and algorithms may not succeed in blocking undesirable content from certain users. Some further criticized the decision based on the financial gain from avoid blocking any game content, as Valve collects a cut from sales through Steam. The National Center on Sexual Exploitation denounced the policy for avoiding corporate and social responsibility "in light of the rise of sexual violence and exploitation games being hosted on Steam".

Sector competition and retailers boycott 
Steam was estimated to have the largest share in the PC digital distribution market in the 2010s. Competitors emerged with Games for Windows – Live in 2008 and Impulse in 2009, both of which were shut down in 2013 and 2014, respectively. In 2013, sales via the Steam catalog are estimated to be between 50 and 75 percent of the total PC gaming market. In 2010 and 2013, with an increase in retail copies of major game publishers integrating or requiring Steam, retailers and journalists referred to the service as a monopoly. They purported that having such a percentage of the overall market can be detrimental to the industry and that sector competition would yield positive results for consumers. Several developers also noted that Steam's influence on the PC gaming market is powerful and one that smaller developers cannot afford to ignore or work with, but believe that Valve's corporate practices for the service make it a type of "benevolent dictator", as Valve attempts to make the service as amenable to developers.

Because of Valve's oversight of sales data, estimates of how much of a market share Steam has in the video game market is difficult to compile. Stardock, developer of competing platform Impulse, estimated that as of 2009, Steam had a 70% share of the digital distribution market for video games. In February 2011, Forbes reported that Steam sales constituted 50–70% of the  market for downloaded PC games and that Steam offered game producers gross margins of 70% of purchase price, compared with 30% at retail.

Steam has been criticized for its reported 30% cut on revenue with publishers from game sales, a value that is similar to other digital storefronts according to IGN. However, some critics have asserted that the share no longer scales with cheaper costs of serving data a decade since Steam's launch. A 2019 Game Developers Conference survey showed only 6% of the 400 respondents deeming the share justified. Epic Games' Tim Sweeney postulated that Valve could reduce its cut to 8%, given that content delivery network costs has dropped significantly. The chat application Discord followed suit a few days later, promoting only a 10% cut on games sold through its store.

In November 2009, online retailers Impulse, Direct2Drive and GamersGate refused to offer Call of Duty: Modern Warfare 2 because it includes mandatory installation of Steamworks. Direct2Drive accused Steamworks of being a "trojan horse", directing users to Valve's store. In December 2010, MCV/Develop reported that "key traditional retailers" would stop offering games that integrate Steam. One UK retailer said if there was already a digital service, they did not want to start selling a rival in physical stores. In June 2009, Doug Lombardi said Steam free weekends for Left 4 Dead on Steam had boosted sales at retail and Xbox 360 as well. Valve's business development director Jason Holtman replied Steamworks' features were chosen by developers and based on consumer wants and that Modern Warfare 2 was one of Steam's "greatest sellers". In December 2011, Football Manager 2012 developer Sports Interactive said the Steam requirement was a success because the game was not cracked for 10 days.

Legal disputes
Steam's predominance in the gaming market has led to Valve becoming involved in various legal cases. The lack of a formal refund policy led the Australian Competition & Consumer Commission (ACCC) to sue Valve in September 2014 for violating Australian consumer laws that required stores to offer refunds for faulty or broken products. The Commission won the lawsuit in March 2016, though recognizing Valve changed its policy in the interim. The ACCC argued to the court that Valve should be fined 3 million Australian dollars "in order to achieve both specific and general deterrents, and also because of the serious nature of the conduct" prior to their policy changes. Valve argued that from the previous court case that "no finding that Valve's conduct was intended to mislead or deceive consumers", and argued for only a  fine. In December 2016, the court ruled with the ACCC and fined Valve , as well as requiring Valve to include proper language for Australian consumers outlining their rights when purchasing games off Steam. Valve sought to appeal the rulings, arguing in part that they did not have a physical presence in Australia, but these were thrown out by higher courts by December 2017. In January 2018, Valve filed for special leave to appeal the decision to the High Court of Australia, but the High Court dismissed this request, affirming that Valve was still bound by Australian law since it sold products directly to Australian citizens. Later in September 2018, Valve's Steam refund policy was found to be in violation of France's consumer laws, and were fined  along with requiring Valve to modify their refund policy appropriately.

In December 2015, the French consumer group UFC-Que Choisir initiated a lawsuit against Valve for several of their Steam policies that conflict or run afoul of French law, including the restriction against reselling of purchased games, which is legal in the European Union. In September 2019, the Tribunal de grande instance de Paris found that Valve's practice of preventing resales violated the European Union's Information Society Directive of 2001 and the Computer Programs Directive of 2009, and required them to allow it in the future. The decision is primarily based on the court's findings that Steam sells licenses to software titles, despite Valve's claim that they were selling subscriptions, which are not covered by the Directives. The company stated that it would appeal the decision. The Interactive Software Federation of Europe (ISFE) issued a statement that the French court ruling goes against established EU case law related to digital copies and threatened to upend much of the digital distribution systems in Europe should it be upheld.

In August 2016, BT Group filed a lawsuit against Valve stating that Steam's client infringes on four of their patents, which they stated were used within Steam's Library, Chat, Messaging, and Broadcasting services.

In 2017, the European Commission began investigating Valve and five other publishers—Bandai Namco Entertainment, Capcom, Focus Home Interactive, Koch Media and ZeniMax Media—for anti-competitive practices, specifically the use of geo-blocking through the Steam storefront and Steam product keys to prevent access to software to citizens of certain countries within the European Economic Area. Such practices would be against the Digital Single Market initiative set by the European Union. The French gaming trade group, Syndicat National du Jeu Vidéo, noted that geo-blocking was a necessary feature to hinder inappropriate product key reselling, where a group buys a number of keys in regions where the cost is low, and then resells them into regions of much higher value to profit on the difference, outside of European oversight and tax laws. Valve had chosen "not to cooperate," and was fined , the most of any of the defendants. The publishers' fines, which amounted to more than €6 million, were reduced for cooperation with the EC.

A January 2021 class-action lawsuit filed against Valve asserted that the company forced developers into entering a "most favored nation"-type of pricing contract to offer games on their storefront, which required the developers to price their games the same on other platforms as they did on Steam, thus stifling competition. Gamasutras Simon Carless analyzed the lawsuit and observed that Valve's terms only apply the resale of Steam keys and not games themselves, and thus the lawsuit may be without merit. A separate class-action lawsuit filed against Valve by Wolfire Games in April 2021 asserted that Steam is essentially a monopoly because, if developers want to sell games to personal computer users, they must sell through Steam, and that its 30% cut and its "most favored nation" pricing practices violate antitrust laws as a result of their position. Valve's response to the suit, filed in July 2021, sought to dismiss the complaint, stating that it "has no duty under antitrust law to allow developers to use free Steam Keys to undersell prices for the games they sell on Steam—or to provide Steam Keys at all". Valve further defended its 30% revenue as meeting the current industry standard. Wolfire's suit was dismissed by the presiding judge in November 2021 after determining that Wolfire had failed to show that Valve had a monopoly on game sales, and the 30% cut is consistent, if not higher, than other vendors. Wolfire refiled their case, narrowing the antitrust complaint toward Valve's use of its dominant power to intimidate developers that sell their game for less on other marketplaces than on Steam, which the judge accepted and allowed the case to proceed in May 2022.

Notes

References

Further reading

External links 

 

 
2003 software
Android (operating system) software
Digital rights management systems
Digital rights management for macOS
Digital rights management for Windows
Freeware
Internet properties established in 2003
IOS software
Multiplayer video game services
Proprietary cross-platform software
Proprietary freeware for Linux
Software based on WebKit